The Edward and Julia Satterfield House, near Scottsville, Kentucky, was built starting in 1902.  It was listed on the National Register of Historic Places in 2005.

Edward Satterfield, a mortician, operated a funeral home out of the house.  It has been described as "a good example of a Queen Anne style house constructed out of yellow poplar."

References

Houses on the National Register of Historic Places in Kentucky
Victorian architecture in Kentucky
Queen Anne architecture in Kentucky
National Register of Historic Places in Allen County, Kentucky
1902 establishments in Kentucky
Houses completed in 1902